Arylalkanolamines (ArROHNR2) are a class of medicinal molecules that are structurally related to one another in certain respects.

Detailed understanding of their structure-activity relationship is expected to aid in drug discovery. 

Beta-adrenergic agonists